The World Series of Women's Cricket was a Women's One Day International series which took place in New Zealand in January and February 2003. The four teams competing were Australia, England, India and New Zealand. The tournament consisted of a double round-robin group stage, in which Australia and New Zealand finished as the top two, and then a third-place play-off and a final were contested to decide the final positions. Australia defeated New Zealand by 109 runs in the final. The three matches that took place between Australia and New Zealand at the tournament were also played for the Rose Bowl, which was won by Australia 3–0. Following the tour, England went on to tour Australia for The Women's Ashes.

Squads

Tour Matches

Points table
Note: P = Played, W = Wins, L = Losses, BP = Bonus Points, CP = Consolation Points, Pts = Points, NRR = Net run rate.

 Source: CricketArchive

Fixtures

Group stage

Third-place play-off

Final

Statistics

Most runs

Most wickets

See also
 English women's cricket team in Australia in 2002–03
 Rose Bowl series

References

External links
 Series home at ESPNCricinfo

2003 in English cricket
2002–03 Australian cricket season
2002–03 New Zealand cricket season
2003 in Indian cricket
2003 in women's cricket
International women's cricket competitions in New Zealand
International cricket competitions in 2003